Another Time may refer to:

 Another Time (book), a 1940 book of poems by W. H. Auden
 Another Time (Jeff Williams album), 2011
 Another Time (Earth, Wind & Fire album), 1974

See also 
 "Another Time (Andrew's Song)", a 2014 song by Annaleigh Ashford and Will Van Dyke
 Another Time, Another Place (disambiguation)
 Another Place, Another Time (disambiguation)